Gallipoli: End of the Road is a 2013 Turkish war film directed by Kemal Uzun and Serdar Akar. It screened as part of the Turkish Film Festival, at Ngā Taonga Sound and Vision, Wellington, on 23 April 2016.

Cast 
 Gürkan Uygun - Muhsin
 Berrak Tüzünataç - Behice
 Umut Kurt - Hasan

References

External links 

Warner Bros. films
2013 war drama films
2013 films
2010s historical drama films
Films about the Gallipoli campaign
Turkish war drama films
Turkish historical drama films
2013 drama films
2010s Turkish-language films